Johann Freiherr Haas von Haagenfels (March 24, 1864 in Haag, Austria – May 15, 1932 in Vienna) was an Austro-Hungarian Army Officer. His exploits during World War I earned him numerous decorations, including the prestigious Military Order of Maria Theresa, the highest Austro-Hungarian Military decoration. (184th Promotion on 17 August 1917).

Career
In the beginning of World War I, Lieutenant Colonel (Oberstleutnant) Johann Haas von Haagenfels commanded Feldjägerbattalion 21. For heroic leadership, he was elevated to the hereditary Austrian nobility with the title "von Haagenfels" on 15 March 1916. Promoted to full colonel (Oberst) and commanding officer of Infantry Regiment 74, he was awarded the Order of Maria Theresia in 1917 and subsequently received a hereditary Austrian barony on 12 September 1918. He was, as of 15 October 1918, commanding officer of the 50 Infantry Brigade, part of Generalmajor Werz von Ostenkampf's 25th Infantry Division. On this day, Haas von Haagenfeld's 50th Brigade consisted of 4th Infantry Regiment, 5th Feldjäger Battalion, 6th Feldjäger Battalion and 10th Feldjäger Battalion. The Division was part of Field Marshal Svetozar Borevic's Army Group Boroević.

After the Great War
Baron von Haagenfels was one of the officers who immediately supported the new Austrian Republic. Promoted to brigadier general (Generalmajor), he was appointed commanding officer of the Volkswehr, the predecessor of the Austrian Federal Army in Vienna and Lower Austria.

Decorations (selection) 

 Knight's Cross of the Military Maria Theresia Order
 Military Merit Cross 2nd Class with War Decoration and Swords
 Order of Leopold (Knight)
 Order of the Iron Crown 3rd Class with War Decoration and Swords
 Honour Insignia 3rd Class of the Austrian Red Cross
 Military Merit Cross 3rd Class with War Decoration and Swords
 Military Merit Cross 3rd Class (peace time award)
 Bronze Military Merit Medal with War Decoration (Signum Laudis)
 Karl Troop Cross (German: Karl-Truppenkreuz)
 Service Badge for Officers 1st Class
 Military Jubilee Medal 1898
 Military Jubilee Cross 1908
 Prussian Iron Cross 2nd Class and 1st Class
 Ottoman Iron Crescent

External links 
The Imperial Austrian Order of Leopold 1914-1918 
http://www.austro-hungarian-army.co.uk/mmto.htm 
http://www.cgsc.edu/CARL/nafziger/918AJAA.pdf

1864 births
1932 deaths
Austro-Hungarian Army officers
Barons of Austria
Austrian generals
Recipients of the Iron Cross (1914), 1st class
Knights Cross of the Military Order of Maria Theresa